Group 5 of the UEFA Euro 1992 qualifying tournament was played as four team group consisting of Belgium, Germany, Luxembourg and Wales.

At the time of the draw on 2 February 1990, Group 5 had contained a fifth team, East Germany. The first scheduled match would see Belgium play East Germany on 12 September 1990.  On 23 August 1990, the East German parliament confirmed reunification would take place on 3 October.  Accordingly, said Belgium-East Germany match, for which tickets had been sold, was still played but as a friendly and was the last match East Germany played. All other games involving East Germany were scratched and fixtures initially scheduled for West Germany were now played as a unified Germany team.

Final table

Results

Goalscorers

References

UEFA website

Attendances – 

Group 5
1990–91 in German football
Qual
1990–91 in Welsh football
1991–92 in Welsh football
1990–91 in Belgian football
1991–92 in Belgian football
1990–91 in Luxembourgian football
1991–92 in Luxembourgian football